Carl Maria von Weber's Symphony No. 1 in C Op. 19, (J. 50) was written in 1806–1807. It was written for Duke Eugen of Württemberg, who employed Weber from 1806.

It has four movements:

References

External links

Compositions by Carl Maria von Weber